West Pond is located east of Big Moose, New York. The outlet creek flows into Big Moose Lake. Fish species present in the lake are brown trout, brook trout, and brown bullhead. There is carry down access on the north shore.

References

Lakes of New York (state)
Lakes of Herkimer County, New York